The Siberian gudgeon (Gobio cynocephalus) is a species of gudgeon, a small freshwater in the family Cyprinidae. It is found in the Amur drainage in Russia, China, and Mongolia.

References

 

Gobio
Fish described in 1869